Ombrosaga is a genus of beetles in the family Cerambycidae, containing the following species:

 Ombrosaga boettcheri Aurivillius, 1922
 Ombrosaga delkeskampi Breuning, 1959
 Ombrosaga maculosa Pascoe, 1864

References

Acanthocinini